Craig Anthony Cuffe Langdon (born 22 May 1957) is an Australian politician. He was a Labor Party member of the Victorian Legislative Assembly from 1996 until 2010. He was a social worker before entering politics.

Langdon resigned from the parliament on 25 August 2010, citing family and personal reasons in a statement, but also accusing a number of his colleagues of "disloyalty and betrayal".

Langdon was also elected as the Mayor of the Banyule City Council as of 2014.
Langdon is a Banyule councillor, representing Olympia Ward.

References

1957 births
Living people
Members of the Victorian Legislative Assembly
Australian Labor Party members of the Parliament of Victoria
21st-century Australian politicians